Federal Highway 29 (Fed. 29) is a free part of the federal highway corridors of Mexico. The highway connects Ciudad Acuña, Coahuila in the north near the Mexico – United States border to Morelos, Coahuila to the south. The total length of Fed. 29 is 104 km (65 mi). City streets in Ciudad Acuña connect the federal highways corridors (los corredores carreteros federales) to U.S. Route 277 in Del Rio, Texas.

References

029